Monochroa arundinetella is a moth of the family Gelechiidae. It is found from Fennoscandia to the Pyrenees, Alps and Hungary and from Great Britain to Ukraine.

The wingspan is 10–12 mm.

The larvae feed on Carex acutiformis, Carex riparia and Carex rostrata. They mine the leaves of their host plant. The mine has the form of a narrow, long corridor. It may change direction. The larva may leave the mine and restart elsewhere. Pupation takes place within the mine in a white cocoon. Larvae can be found from March to May. They are whitish with a black head.

Taxonomy
Some sources list Boyd as the author of the species, claiming it was described by him in 1857.

References

Moths described in 1858
Monochroa
Moths of Europe